Phuzshukela (John Bhengu) was one of the first maskanda musicians, and has been described as a pioneer of the genre and the first rural artist in South Africa to achieve prominence.

He influenced later artists such as Johnny Clegg, Busi Mhlongo and Phuzekhemisi among others.

Discography

 Sizwile Nsizwa (1975)
 Asambeni Siye Kwelakithi (1977)
 Sehlule Umkhomazi (1982)

References

South African guitarists
Zulu music
Maskanda musicians
People from KwaZulu-Natal
1930 births
2011 deaths